The Kakavia or Kakavijë border crossing is a major road border crossing between southern Albania and northwestern Greece. On the Albanian side lies the village of Kakavijë, located in the Gjirokastër County, Dropull region. On the Greek side lies the village of Ktismata, in the Delvinaki municipality, Ioannina regional unit. The main road from Sarandë and Gjirokastër to Ioannina passes through this border crossing. The Greek National Road 22 (GR-22, European route E853) connects Kakavia with the GR-20 at Kalpaki.

On August 27, 1923, the Italian general Enrico Tellini, three of his assistants, and their interpreter fell into an ambush and were assassinated by unknown assailants at Kakavia, leading to the Corfu incident.

Albania–Greece border crossings